ACC Limited (Formerly The Associated Cement Companies Limited) an Indian cement producer, headquartered in Mumbai. It is a subsidiary of Ambuja Cements and a part of the Adani Group. On 1 September 2006, the name of The Associated Cement Companies Limited was changed to ACC Limited. The company was established in Mumbai, Maharashtra on 1 August 1936.

History
In 1936, eleven cement companies belonging to Tata, Khatau, Killick Nixon and FE Dinshaw groups merged to form a single entity, The Associated Cement Companies. Sir Nowroji B Saklatvala was the first chairman of ACC. The first board of directors had some prominent industrialists—J R D Tata, Ambalal Sarabhai, Walchand Hirachand, Dharamsey Khatau, Sir Akbar Hydari, Nawab Salar Jung Bahadur and Sir Homy Mody.

The list of companies that were merged: 
 The Indian Cement Co. Ltd.
 The Katni Cement and Industrial Co. Ltd.
 Budhi Portland Cement Ltd.
 The Okha Cement Co. Ltd.
 The Gwalior Cement Company Ltd.
 The Punjab Portland Cement
 The United Cement Co. Ltd.
 The Shahabad Cement Co. Ltd.
 The Coimbatore Cement
 The Dewarkhand Cement Co. Ltd.
 The C. P. Cement Co. Ltd.

The management control of company was taken over by Swiss cement manufacturer Holcim Group in 2004. ACC operated as subsidiary of Lafarge Holcim. On 1 September 2006, the name of The Associated Cement Companies Limited was changed to ACC Limited. The company is the only cement company to get Superbrand status in India.

On 14 April 2022, Holcim announced that it would exit from the Indian market after 17 years of operations as part of a strategy to focus on core markets, and listed its stakes in ACC and Ambuja Cements for sale.

On 15 May 2022, Adani Group acquired Holcim's stake in ACC and Ambuja Cements for US$10.5 billion.

References

External links 
 ACC

Cement companies of India
Manufacturing companies based in Mumbai
Manufacturing companies established in 1936
Indian companies established in 1936
Holcim Group
Companies listed on the National Stock Exchange of India
Companies listed on the Bombay Stock Exchange